Santolan station is an elevated Manila Light Rail Transit (LRT) station situated on Line 2. It is located in along the Marikina–Infanta Highway in Calumpag, Marikina, near its boundary with Pasig.

From 2003 to 2021, this station was the eastern terminus of the line. The station became an intermediate station when the Line 2 East Extension opened on July 5, 2021. This station currently serves as the eleventh station for trains headed to Antipolo and the third station for trains headed to Recto. The Santolan Depot, where the trains of the line are cleaned and maintained, is also near the station, as well as the line's Operations Control Center (OCC), all are located in Pasig.

This is the only station on this line with an island platform.

Santolan station was temporarily closed due to a fire on October 3, 2019 which affected two rectifiers along the line: one between Katipunan and Anonas stations, and the other in the Santolan Depot. The station was reopened on January 22, 2021 after repairs to the rectifiers were completed.

Nearby landmarks
The station is near the Marikina River, BFCT East Metro Manila Transport Terminal, SM City Marikina, and Riverbanks Center connecting via footbridge. It is also near Bali Oasis and College of Arts and Sciences of Asia and the Pacific in Marikina.

Transportation links
Taxis, shuttle services, and jeepneys can be used to navigate the area around the station and along Marcos Highway, Marikina. It is also easily accessible to C-5 via Diosdado Macapagal Bridge going to Eastwood City, Ortigas Center, Makati Central Business District, Bonifacio Global City, as well as NAIA and SLEX.

Gallery

References

Manila Light Rail Transit System stations
Railway stations opened in 2003
Buildings and structures in Marikina